Gregg Doyel is a sports columnist for the Indianapolis Star, formerly a national sports writer for CBSSports.com, who three times has been named the country's top sports columnist by the Associated Press Sports Editors. Doyel has earned 13 different APSE Top 10 awards, seven for columns, including firsts in 2014, '17 and '19, a second in 2010, and a third in 2016.

Early life and education 

Gregg Doyel was born in Hawaii. He grew up in Mississippi, where his father was a law professor at the University of Mississippi.  Doyel attended high school in Georgia and attended college at the University of Florida. At Stratford Academy in Macon, Ga., he was named all-state twice in baseball (1987, '88) for coaches Bubber Adams and Bobby Henley, and once in soccer (1986) for coach Sharad Apte.

Journalism and broadcasting career 

Before coming to the Star, he was a national columnist for CBSSports.com. Doyel was also the site's college basketball writer before becoming a columnist. He has written two books, titled Kentucky Wildcats: Where have you gone? and Coach K: Building the Duke Dynasty. Before working at Sportsline.com, he was a sports writer with the Tampa Tribune, Florida Marlins beat writer at the Miami Herald and an ACC basketball writer with the Charlotte Observer. On May 21, 2007, it was announced that Doyel would host a radio program on Cincinnati's WCKY (AM) in the 9AM-Noon time slot with Mo Egger. He hosted the WCKY show until he was discharged in the wake of a budget cut on December 13, 2007. Doyel also briefly co-hosted WLW's "Sunday Morning SportsTalk" with Ken Broo, but voluntarily left the show because he was traveling excessively for CBSSports.com.

Awards 

In 2010, Doyel finished second in the Associated Press Sports Editors' annual contest for column writing. He finished first in 2014  and again in 2017.

Dennis Howell of DallasProSportSpot.com named Doyel "Columnist of the Year" for 2011.

In January 2015, it was announced that Gregg Doyel was named winner of the U.S. Harness Writers Association's 53rd Annual John Hervey Award for Excellence in Harness Racing Journalism. He was honored for his column on trainer/driver Verlin Yohder titled "Hey Hollywood! Another Classic Indiana Underdog Story", which appeared in the November 11, 2014 issue of the Indianapolis Star.

References 

Living people
American sportswriters
University of Florida alumni
Writers from Hawaii
Year of birth missing (living people)
Place of birth missing (living people)